The Trout River is a  tributary of the St. Johns River in Duval County, Florida. Located entirely within Jacksonville's Northside area, the river is brackish in its lower section. The Trout River has wetlands as far as the mouth of the river's longest tributary, the Ribault River.

Tributaries
Major tributaries of the Trout River include the Ribault River, Little Trout River, and Moncrief Creek.

Course 

Beginning in northwestern Jacksonville, in Duval County, the river starts out as a creek.  east of the source, the river is crossed by U.S. 1.  downstream, the creek passes through the subdivision of River Falls. After this, the river widens into wetlands with a multitude of tributaries.  downstream, a long tributary named the "Little Trout River". It originates at the forest at the corner of U.S. 1 and Interstate 295.  downstream, Lem Turner Road (State Road 115) crosses the river as the C Ray Greene Bridge.  downstream, the river becomes brackish. There is also the Ribault River, the longest of the three main tributaries.  downstream, Interstate 95 crosses the river as the Trout River Bridge.  downstream is Moncrief Creek, the third and last tributary of the Trout River.  downstream, U.S. Route 17 crosses the river, spanning .  downstream is the St. Johns River, the mouth of the river at Sandfly Point.

List of crossings

Destinations along the river 
Jacksonville Zoo
Trout River Boulevard is a residential road that run along partially along the Trout River. It runs for  along the floodplain of the river. At the  mark, the road turns away from the river.
Western Terminus: Old Kings Road 
Coordinates: 
Eastern Terminus: Lem Turner Boulevard
Coordinates: 
Navy Fuel Depot

Riverside parks
North Shore Park is a forested park at the north end of Pearl Street in North Shore neighborhood of Jacksonville, covering .
Coordinates: 
Riverside Park is a park that features two docks.
Coordinates:

See also
List of Florida rivers

References

Trout River Replacement

Rivers of Florida
Tributaries of the St. Johns River
Geography of Jacksonville, Florida
Bodies of water of Duval County, Florida
Northside, Jacksonville